Maranthes is a genus of plant in the family Chrysobalanaceae described as a genus in 1825.

Maranthes is native to tropical regions of Africa, Southeast Asia, Australia, Central America, and various oceanic islands.

Species
 Maranthes aubrevillei  - W Africa
 Maranthes chrysophylla  - W + C Africa
 Maranthes corymbosa  - Malaysia, Indonesia, Thailand, Papuasia, Philippines, Palau
 Maranthes floribunda  - C Africa
 Maranthes gabunensis  - C Africa
 Maranthes glabra  - W + C Africa
 Maranthes goetzeniana  - Tanzania, Mozambique, Zimbabwe
 Maranthes kerstingii  - W + C Africa
 Maranthes panamensis  - Nicaragua, Costa Rica, Panama
 Maranthes polyandra  - from Ivory Coast to South Sudan
 Maranthes robusta  - W Africa
 Maranthes sanagensis  - Cameroon

References

External links

Chrysobalanaceae genera
Chrysobalanaceae
Taxonomy articles created by Polbot